Dioon sonorense is a species of cycad native to northern Mexico.

References

Whitelock, Loran M. 2002. The Cycads. Portland: Timber Press.

External links
 

sonorense
Flora of Mexico